Armenia selected their Junior Eurovision Song Contest 2009 entry by a national final. The winner was Luara Hayrapetyan with "Barcelona", which represented Armenia in the Junior Eurovision Song Contest 2009 on 21 November 2009.

Before Junior Eurovision

National final 
A submission period for artists was held until 29 June 2009. 15 entries were received, and 7 entries were chosen for the national final.

The final was held on 11 July 2009. Seven songs competed and the winner was chosen by a 50/50 combination of televoting and the votes from an "expert" jury.

At Junior Eurovision

Voting

Notes

References

External links 
 Official Armenian Junior Eurovision Site of 2009

Junior Eurovision Song Contest
Armenia
2009